Main Street is a major north–south thoroughfare bisecting Vancouver, British Columbia, Canada. It runs from Waterfront Road by Burrard Inlet in the north, to Kent Avenue alongside the north arm of the Fraser River in the south.

Route
Beginning by the Port of Vancouver terminals near the nexus of the city's historic Downtown Eastside and Gastown districts, the street runs south through Chinatown south of Hastings Street and continues past the Pacific Central railway station and the Main Street–Science World SkyTrain station. At Terminal Avenue, it slopes up into the Mount Pleasant neighbourhood, which mixes commerce, light industry, brewing, and high-density residential areas. The residential/commercial mix continues south of Broadway, with a high density of restaurants and fashion retailing. This neighbourhood was once blue-collar but is growing distinctly upscale.

Between 33rd Avenue and 41st Avenue, the street becomes decidedly more residential as it reaches its topographical summit. South of 41st Avenue, the street enters the Sunset neighbourhood and takes on a markedly Indo-Canadian character. The Punjabi Market district begins just north of 49th Avenue; south of the Market the street again becomes predominantly residential.

At Main Street's intersection with Marine Drive in southern Vancouver, its character becomes big-box commercial, notably including a Real Canadian Superstore supermarket. Between Marine Drive and its southern terminus, Main Street's neighbourhood is a highly miscellaneous commercial mix including office space, manufacturing, and warehousing.

History
The north end of Main Street is located just west of the historic site of Hastings Mill, the nucleus around which the settlement of Granville, later Vancouver, grew. In its earliest days, the intersection of Main Street and Hastings Street was the centre of downtown Vancouver, boasting the city's central public library (now the Carnegie Centre) and — a few blocks away — the old City Hall. The intersection of Main and Hastings is now a local byword for the poverty, addictions, homelessness, and prostitution often associated with the Downtown Eastside.

The thoroughfare was originally named "Westminster Avenue", since it connects to New Westminster Road (now Kingsway). It received its present name in 1910 at the behest of local merchants, who thought that it bestowed a more cosmopolitan air to the neighbourhood.

Main Street was previously separated into two segments by False Creek, with a bascule bridge linking the two. The two segments were joined together after the eastern section of False Creek was reclaimed for railway lands in the 1910s and 1920s.

Neighbourhoods
Main Street passes through the following Vancouver neighbourhoods (north to south):
Downtown Eastside
Old Japantown
Chinatown
Strathcona
Mount Pleasant
Riley Park–Little Mountain
Punjabi Market
Sunset

Major intersections
From north to south.

References

External links

Extract from The History of Metropolitan Vancouver by Chuck Davis.

Streets in Vancouver
Former segments of the Trans-Canada Highway